Kevo Strict Nature Reserve is a strict nature reserve located in Utsjoki, northern Lapland, Finland.

The reserve is a popular backpacking destination due to its canyon-like gorge valley. It is surrounded by more level fell upland.

Walking in the reserve is only permitted along two marked routes. Both routes are difficult and include e.g. many paddle crossings.

Gallery

External links
 

Strict nature reserves of Finland
Protected areas of the Arctic
Utsjoki
Geography of Lapland (Finland)
Tourist attractions in Lapland (Finland)